The Beast with Five Fingers is a 1946 mystery horror film directed by Robert Florey from a screenplay by Curt Siodmak, based on a short story written by W. F. Harvey and first published in 1919 in The New Decameron. The film stars Robert Alda,  Victor Francen, Andrea King, and Peter Lorre. The film's score was composed by Max Steiner.

Plot 
Francis Ingram is a noted pianist who lives in a large manor house in Italy. Ingram suffered a stroke which left his right side immobile, and he has to use a wheelchair to get around. He has retreated to the manor house for the past few years, where he lives with his nurse, Julie Holden; his secretary and astrologist Hilary Cummins; a friend, Bruce Conrad; and his sister's son, Donald Arlington. Holden and Conrad are secretly in love. Holden plans to leave Ingram's service and return to America, but wants to talk it over with Ingram first. Conrad wants her to instead leave immediately, feeling that caring for Ingram is sapping her vitality, while Cummins opposes her leaving at all, saying he will be left with no time to do his work without her to take care of Ingram's needs. After witnessing Holden and Conrad kissing, Cummins tells Ingram of the affair. Ingram, unwilling to believe it, starts to choke Cummins. Holden's intervention saves him, but Ingram orders him out of the manor.

That night, Ingram is awakened by a storm outside. He climbs into his wheelchair and, disoriented by hallucinations, falls down the stairs, breaking his neck. Commissario Ovidio Castanio of the local police investigates the death, and finds no sign of foul play.

Holden, Cummins, Conrad, Donald and his father Raymond Arlington, and Duprex, Ingram's attorney, gather for the reading of Ingram's will and testament. The Arlingtons assume they will get everything, and gloat to Cummins that they plan to have his cherished books shipped off and sold. Instead, Ingram's will grants all he owns to Holden. The Arlingtons threaten to have the will annulled by having Holden found culpable in Ingram's death, as his nurse. Duprex tells the Arlingtons that Ingram wrote an older will which gave everything to Donald, and offers to help overturn the new will in favor of the old one in exchange for a third of the estate. That night, while forging the "older will", Duprex is strangled to death. Only the assailant's left hand (which has Ingram's ring) is seen.

Castanio investigates. Everyone hears Ingram playing the piano in the main hall, but when they go to check no one is there. Castanio witnesses Donald attacked and almost choked to death by the hand with Ingram's ring. He checks Ingram's coffin and finds that Ingram's left hand has been cut off, a hand-sized hole has been broken out of a window, and outside the hole is a trail of handprints. Castanio begins to believe Ingram's severed hand may have killed Duprex.

Cummins sees the disembodied hand while working in the library. He grabs the hand and locks it in a desk drawer. When he summons Conrad and Holden to show them, the hand is gone, and they assume it to have been a figment of his imagination. Donald remembers the combination and location of a safe in the house, and Castanio and his father accompany him to the room where it is located. Inside is the disembodied hand. In a panic, Donald flees the house with Conrad in pursuit. Holden realizes that Cummins is the killer, having acted to safeguard his books, but his conscience is driving him mad, making him insist that the hand did it all. She urges him to turn himself in, promising to speak on his behalf. He instead tries to kill her to keep her from telling anyone else. To stay his hand, she claims to believe the hand is responsible, and begs Cummins to protect her from it. Completely convinced by his delusion, Cummins seizes the hand and throws it in the fire, but the burning hand crawls out and chokes him, fading out of existence after he collapses.

Castanio and Conrad discover a hidden record player with a recording of Ingram's piano playing which Cummins remotely triggered from his desk. Castanio theorizes that Cummins cut off the hand, which he kept in his desk or the safe whenever not using it in an attack.

Cast 

 Robert Alda as Bruce Conrad
 Andrea King as Julie Holden
 Peter Lorre as Hilary Cummins
 Victor Francen as Francis Ingram
 J. Carrol Naish as Commissario Ovidio Castanio
 Charles Dingle as Raymond Arlington
 John Alvin as Donald Arlington
 David Hoffman as Duprex
 Barbara Brown as Mrs. Miller
 Patricia White as Clara
 William Edmunds as Antonio
 Belle Mitchell as Giovanna
 Ray Walker as Mr. Miller
 Pedro de Cordoba as Horatio

Production
The film was Warner Bros.' only foray into the horror genre in the 1940s and was Peter Lorre's last film with the studio.

Graham Baker was reported as working on a script for Warner Bros in 1945. Robert Florey was assigned to direct with Andrea King and Paul Henreid to star. The screenwriter Curt Siodmak had originally written the film for Henreid, who turned it down. Robert Alda was cast instead.

Filming started November 27, 1945. The piece much played throughout the film is a slightly modified version of Brahms' transcription for left hand of the chaconne from Johann Sebastian Bach's Violin Partita in D minor, performed by Warner Bros. pianist Victor Aller. His hand is shown playing the piano and throughout the movie.

Release

Home media
The film was released on Laser Disc by MGM/UA Home Video on March 16, 1999 and released on DVD by Warner Brothers on October 1, 2013.

Shown on the MeTV show Svengoolie on March 26, 2022.

Reception

Author and film critic Leonard Maltin awarded the film two and a half out of a possible four stars, calling it "[an] Intriguing, if not entirely successful mood piece".
Bob Mastrangelo from Allmovie gave the film a positive review, calling it "effectively eerie", and praised the film's special effects.

See also 
 The Hands of Orlac (1924) – Austrian silent film adaptation of the novel by Maurice Renard
 Mad Love (1935) – American sound remake of The Hands of Orlac
 The Hands of Orlac (1960) – British-French adaptation of the Renard novel
 Hands of a Stranger (1962)
 The Crawling Hand (1963)
 The Hand of Fear (1976) – Doctor Who episode inspired by The Beast with Five Fingers
 The Hand (1981) – remake of The Beast with Five Fingers directed by Oliver Stone
 Evil Dead II (1987) – reference of The Hand and The Beast with Five Fingers
 Idle Hands (1999)

Notes

External links 

 
 
 
 
 
 Read the story at https://web.archive.org/web/20091231170928/http://thenostalgialeague.com/olmag/beast.html

1946 films
1946 horror films
1940s mystery horror films
American mystery horror films
American black-and-white films
1940s English-language films
Films about pianos and pianists
Films based on short fiction
Films directed by Robert Florey
Films scored by Max Steiner
Films set in country houses
Films set in Italy
Films with screenplays by Curt Siodmak
Warner Bros. films
1940s American films